CNCF may refer to:

 Christina Noble Children's Foundation
 Cloud Native Computing Foundation, a Linux Foundation project
 Concarril, Mexican rail car manufacturer